The 2003 Eastbourne Borough Council election took place on 1 May 2003 to elect members of Eastbourne Borough Council in East Sussex, England. One third of the council was up for election and the Liberal Democrats stayed in overall control of the council.

After the election, the composition of the council was:
Liberal Democrats 14
Conservative 13

Background
Before the election the Liberal Democrats had a 3-seat majority on the council, with 15 councillors compared to 12 for the Conservative Party. A total of 33 candidates stood for the 9 seats being contested, with candidates from the Liberal Democrats, Conservatives, Labour Party, Green Party and 1 from the UK Independence Party.

The Conservatives campaigned hard on the 38% rise in council tax, fourth highest in the country, that the Liberal Democrat controlled council had made. However the Liberal Democrats defended the rise, saying there had been a poor central government grant and that most of the rise had been due to needing to replace the company doing refuse collection. The Liberal Democrats also pointed to the reopening of the Old Town Library and the Beachy Head Countryside Centre, with anger at these closures having helped the Liberal Democrats gain control at the 2002 election.

During the campaign the Conservative shadow deputy prime minister David Davis visited Eastbourne to support the Conservatives at the election.

Election result
The Liberal Democrats lost a seat to the Conservatives, reducing their majority on the council to just 1 seat. The Conservative gain came in Old Town ward, where Ian Lucas took the seat for the party, with the increase in council tax being reported as a major reason for the Conservative gain. Overall turnout at the election was 33.6%, compared to 33.9% in 2002.

Ward results

References

2003
2003 English local elections
2000s in East Sussex